Alan Twigg, CM  has received the Order of Canada, as a prolific journalist, historian, biographer, website-builder, film maker, community-builder and athlete. He created Canada's most-read, independent publication about books, BC Bookworld, a trade newspaper for the British Columbia book publishing industry and served as its publisher and main writer for thirty-three years until he gave the business away in 2020. He also founded or co-founded many of the province's major literary awards. When he was accorded an honorary doctorate by Simon Fraser University in 2022, SFU described him as British Columbia's leading man of letters. He also developed  ABCBookWorld, an online encyclopedia of British Columbia authors. He is also a recipient of the Lieutenant Governor's Award for Literary Excellence in 2016.

Early life and career 

Twigg was born in 1952 in North Vancouver, British Columbia.  He began freelance writing in the 1970s, and helped found the B.C. Book Prize in 1985.  In the 1980s and 1990s, he wrote columns and reviews for the Vancouver Sun, the Globe and Mail, Quill and Quire, and the Toronto Star, as well as publishing books on the literature of Vancouver, British Columbian, Belizean, and Cuban history, the Dalai Lama, and soccer, among other topics. In 1987, he started BC Bookworld, a quarterly trade newspaper focused on British Columbia-based books and authors, both fiction and non-fiction. It is Canada's largest circulation book-related publication. He published it for 33 years before giving it away. He also created and wrote a massive reference site called ABCBookWorld, for and about more than 12,000 British Columbia authors, hosted by Simon Fraser University Library (until 2020).

Accolades
In 2022, he was accorded a Doctorate of Literature from Simon Fraser University. Simon Fraser University described him as British Columbia's leading man of letters when it accorded an honorary doctorate.

That same year he published Out of Hiding: Holocaust Literature of British Columbia and created the world's foremost website for and about the Holocaust whistleblower Rudolf Vrba (www.rudolfvrba.com).

He won a gold medal for Canada at the World Masters Games in Turin, Italy, in 2007, for Over-50s soccer.

Books 
Twigg has written 21 books on a wide variety of subjects, from BC Literary history, to biographies and travel journals. You may read about them on his website, http://www.alantwigg.com

Websites 
In addition to his writing, Twigg has written and created four websites to honour remarkable people. All original writing and researching on these pages are his. 

They are:

Yosef Wosk, Explorer, activist, writer and philanthropist

Leonard Cohen , poet and musician

Rudolf Vrba, Auschwitz escapee and WWII’s foremost whistleblower

Father Placid Kindata, Tanzanian community builder

References

External links 
Records of Alan Twigg are held by Simon Fraser University's Special Collections and Rare Books

Canadian publishers (people)
1952 births
People from North Vancouver
Writers from British Columbia
Living people
Members of the Order of Canada